Vacqueriette-Erquières is a commune in the Pas-de-Calais department in the Hauts-de-France region of France.

Geography
Vacqueriette-Erquières is located 18 miles (27 km) southeast of Montreuil-sur-Mer on the D122 road, 4 miles (6 km) south of Hesdin.

Population

Places of interest
 The church of Notre-Dame and, at Erquières, St. Firmin's church, both dating from the nineteenth century.

See also
Communes of the Pas-de-Calais department

References

Vacquerietteerquieres
Artois